Christian Glasgow (b St Vincent)  is an Anglican priest: he has been Archdeacon of Grenada since 2011.

References

Living people
People from Saint Vincent (Antilles)
Archdeacons of Grenada
Year of birth missing (living people)